The Agent of Change Award is an annual award constituted in 2016 by the Global Partnerships Forum to recognize Champions of Gender Equality and Women's Empowerment, in support of UN Women.

The Awards are conferred by the UN Assistant Secretary-General for Intergovernmental Support and Strategic Partnerships and the president of the Global Partnerships Forum at the Headquarters of the United Nations, in New York City. The Agent of Change Award statuette is based on artist Spar Street's sculpture of the same name.

2016 awards

On September 21, 2016, the first Agent of Change Awards were conferred upon:

2017 awards
On September 20, 2017, Agent of Change Awards were conferred upon:

See also
 List of awards honoring women

References

Awards established in 2016
United Nations awards
Awards honoring women